The Miss Universe Canada 2020 was the 18th edition of Miss Universe Canada pageant. It was held on October 24, 2020 at John Bassett Theatre, Metro Toronto Convention Centre in Toronto. Alyssa Boston of Ontario crowned Nova Stevens of British Columbia as her successor at the end of the event. Stevens represented Canada at Miss Universe 2020, while first runner-up Tamara Jemuovic represented Canada at Miss International 2021 and second runner-up Jaime VandenBerg represented the country in Reinado Internacional del Café 2020 and 3rd runner-up Svetlana Mamaeva represented the country in Miss World 2021.

For the first time in history, the organization had 18 franchises for the provinces and territories and three cities of Canada, where they selected 55 candidates to participate in the national pageant.

Final results

Special awards

Delegates

References

External links
Official Website

2020
2020s in Ontario
2020 beauty pageants